Claymore was the name ship of her class of destroyers built for the French Navy in the first decade of the 20th century.

References

Bibliography

 

Claymore-class destroyers
Ships built in France
1906 ships